The 2007–08 Munster Rugby season was Munster's seventh season competing in the Celtic League, alongside which they also competed in the Heineken Cup. It was Declan Kidney's third and final season as head coach, in his second spell at the province.

2007–08 squad

}

Pre-season

2007–08 Celtic League

2007–08 Heineken Cup

Pool 5

Quarter-final

Semi-final

Final

References

External links
2007–08 Munster Rugby season official site 

2007–08
2007–08 Celtic League by team
2007–08 in Irish rugby union
2007–08 Heineken Cup by team